Bury Bolton Street railway station is a heritage railway station in Bury, Greater Manchester, England. Located on the East Lancashire Railway.

History 
It was formerly the main station serving the town, with links north to Ramsbottom, thence via Stubbins Junction either to Rawtenstall and Bacup or to Haslingden and Accrington; and south to Radcliffe Central, Whitefield, Prestwich and Manchester Victoria or via  to Clifton Junction and the Bolton line. There was also a local branch to Holcombe Brook and a curve to connect with Bury Knowsley Street station.

The station was opened by the East Lancashire Railway (ELR), on 28 September 1846, as Bury station. The ELR was absorbed by the Lancashire & Yorkshire Railway on 13 May 1859. The station was renamed Bury Bolton Street in February 1866. The building is situated in a cutting with a low level yard on the east side, approached by an incline from Bolton Street and a flight of steps from Bank Street. To the north is the Bolton Street Tunnel.

In its original incarnation, it boasted the headquarters of the East Lancashire Railway, situated on the up platform adjacent to the yard. This fine neo-classical structure in the italianate style had the usual station accommodation on the ground floor and the company offices (including a boardroom) on the upper floors. The headquarters building supported an overall train shed roof in the Paxton style, supported on the other side by a row of iron columns on an island platform. The west side had through lines and a rope-hauled incline giving access to the wagon works, now the site of Bury Leisure Centre.

The station was rebuilt in the 1880s and the existing platform canopy dates from that time. Street frontage buildings were also provided.

The Manchester - Prestwich - Radcliffe Central - Bury line was electrified in 1916.

The station passed to the London Midland and Scottish Railway in 1923. From 1 January 1948, the station was operated by British Railways.

The street level buildings were destroyed by fire on 14 May 1947 and were replaced with a new brick and concrete entrance and footbridge in 1952. The old headquarters building was demolished in January 1974.

BR closed the station on 17 March 1980, when it was replaced by a new bus/rail interchange; this has been the terminus of the Metrolink service from Manchester since 1991.

Station information 

The station was extensively remodelled by the Lancashire and Yorkshire Railway (the company absorbed the ELR in 1859) who gave it its present form. There are four platforms, viz:

Platform 1. A bay platform at the south east end.

Platform 2. The up platform on the east side.

Platform 3. The down platform, one side of the island platform.

Platform 4. A bidirectional platform, one side of the island platform and adjacent to the Western retaining walls which had a unique bidirectional signal mounted on a wall bracket.

The platforms were equipped with normal canopies and a new entrance was created on Bolton Street, with street frontage buildings across the tracks accessing a footbridge.

Since re-opening as part of the heritage railway operated by the East Lancashire Railway, a new platform building, incorporating a façade from the former Bury tram depot, has been erected on the up platform and the station is undergoing a comprehensive refurbishment and redevelopment plan. It is once again signalled and the old Bury South box is back in operation.

Original services 
Passenger trains on the Holcombe Brook branch ended in 1952. Those on the lines to Accrington, Bacup & Clifton Junction were withdrawn in 1966, with the Rawtenstall trains following suit in 1972. That left only the link to Manchester Victoria which in turn was severed in 1980 with the opening of Bury Interchange. Bolton Street Station, with its original features, was rescued from demolition and placed in the care of the East Lancashire Railway, a preservation group. The line to Ramsbottom and Rawtenstall was re-opened as a heritage railway, under the name East Lancashire Railway in 1987 and has since been extended to Heywood. The line and station have since become a leading tourist attraction in the area.

Gallery

Present day services

References 
Lost Railways of Lancashire by Gordon Suggitt
The Directory of Railway Stations, R.V.J. Butt, 1995, Patrick Stephens 
Encyclopedia of British Railway Companies, Christopher Awdry, 1990, Guild Publishing (CN 8983)

Heritage railway stations in the Metropolitan Borough of Bury
Former Lancashire and Yorkshire Railway stations
Buildings and structures in Bury, Greater Manchester
Railway stations in Great Britain opened in 1846
Railway stations in Great Britain closed in 1980
Railway stations in Great Britain opened in 1987
1846 establishments in England